The 11th Lumières Awards ceremony, presented by the Académie des Lumières, was held on 21 February 2006. Claudia Cardinale presided the ceremony for the second time. The Beat That My Heart Skipped won the award for Best Film.

Winners

See also
 31st César AwardsReferences

External links
 
 
 11th Lumières Awards at AlloCiné''

Lumières Awards
Lumieres
Lumieres
Lumieres
Lumieres